Kastraki is a former community in Kastoria regional unit, West Macedonia, Greece. Since the 2011 local government reform it is part of the municipality Kastoria, of which it is a municipal unit. The municipal unit has an area of 78.415 km2. Population 560 (2011). The seat of the community was in Ieropigi. The other village in the community is Dendrochori. The village Agios Dimitrios (Labanitsa) is abandoned today.

See also 
 Kastraki, Phocis

References 

Former municipalities in Western Macedonia
Populated places in Kastoria (regional unit)

bg:Костур (дем)